The Hand of Ethelberta: A Comedy in Chapters is a novel by Thomas Hardy, published in 1876.  It was written, in serial form, for The Cornhill Magazine, which was edited by Leslie Stephen, a friend and mentor of Hardy's. Unlike the majority of Hardy's fiction, the novel is a comedy, with both humour and a happy ending for the major characters and no suicides or tragic deaths. The late nineteenth century novelist George Gissing, who knew Hardy, considered it "surely old Hardy's poorest book".

Plot summary
At the beginning of the book, it is told that Ethelberta was raised in humble circumstances but, through her work as a governess, married well at the age of eighteen. Her husband died two weeks after the wedding and, now twenty-one, Ethelberta lives with her mother-in-law, Lady Petherwin. In the three years that have elapsed since the deaths of both her husband and father-in-law, Ethelberta has been treated to foreign travel and further privilege by her benefactress, but restricted from seeing her poor family.

The events of the story concern Ethelberta's career as a famous poet and storyteller as she struggles to support her family and conceal her secret—that her father is a butler. Beautiful, clever, and rational, she easily attracts four very persistent suitors (Mr. Christopher Julian (a struggling musician), Mr. Neigh and Mr. Ladywell, both gentlemen and friends, and Lord Mountclere, a 65-year old aristocrat with a dubious past, but is reluctant to give her much-coveted hand. She finally elects for Lord Mountclere, after he discovers the secret of her low birth and family, and she comes to dominate him, running his estate and saving him from bankruptcy. Her unrequited suitor Christopher Julian realises he would never have been happy with her had she married him, and settles for her younger sister Picotee who had been in love with him for years.

Illustrations by George du Maurier

Reception

Adaptations
It was adapted for BBC Radio 4 by Katherine Jakeways. The one-hour play was released just before International Women's Day 2021, as part of a series on Hardy's women.

See also

References

External links

 

1876 British novels
Novels by Thomas Hardy
English novels
Works originally published in The Cornhill Magazine
Novels first published in serial form